Boots is a lost 1919 American silent comedy film directed by Elmer Clifton and starring Dorothy Gish. It was produced by D. W. Griffith, his New Art Film Co., and distributed through Famous Players-Lasky and Paramount Pictures.

Cast
Dorothy Gish as "Boots"
Richard Barthelmess as Everett White
Fontaine La Rue as Madame De Valdee
Edward Peil, Sr. as Nicholas Jerome
Kate Toncray as Lydia Hampstead
Raymond Cannon as The Chauffeur

Release
The film played at the Strand Theatre in Christchurch, New Zealand, shortly before Christmas in 1919.

References

External links

1919 films
American silent feature films
Lost American films
Films directed by Elmer Clifton
1919 comedy films
American black-and-white films
Silent American comedy films
1919 lost films
Lost comedy films
1910s American films
1910s English-language films